Aphthonius may refer to:
 Aelius Festus Aphthonius (4th century), Latin grammarian, possibly of African origin
 Aphthonius of Antioch (late 4th century), Greek sophist and rhetorician
 Aphthonius of Alexandria (4th century), ancient Gnostic bishop